Entering a New Era is a 2018 Chinese romantic comedy directed by Fu Ning and starring Lu Yi and Yuan Quan. It aired on Hunan Television starting November 5, 2018.

Synopsis
The series focuses on the life of a former soldier-turned-entrepreneur Fang Bangyan in the wave of China's reform and opening-up launched in 1978 by Deng Xiaoping.

Cast

Main
 Lu Yi as Fang Bangyan, an ambitious ex-serviceman who self-learn English and German, and becomes an entrepreneur. 
 Yuan Quan as He Xiaoying, born into in a family of officials, Fang's wife.

Supporting
 Zhu Yuchen as Kang Ning
 Xu Honghao as He Youling
 Liu Tingzuo as Lin Yun
 Wang Weiwei as Liang Yue
 Han Tongsheng as He Zhengqing
 Ding Yongdai as Fang Xiaowu
 Zhang Lingxin as He Xiaoyan
 Wu Mian as Zheng Lan
 Wu Gang as Hou Bingzhong
 Chang Chen-kuang as Zhang Wei
 Wang Weiyi as Fang Bangyun
 Zhang Tong as Lin Shuzhen
 Tong Chenjie as Gu Pan
 Yue Xiuqing as Qin Fang
 Liu Yi as Tao Ran
 Tan Kai as Xiu Qi
 Li Xinbo as Fang Ling
 Zhang Haoyue as Zhao Feipeng

Soundtrack

Production
Production started in April 2018 and ended in August of the same year.

The TV series is a collaboration between Lu Yi and Yuan Quan after six years in the Chinese-South Korean coproduction My Ex-wife's Wedding.

References

2018 Chinese television series debuts
2018 Chinese television series endings
Chinese period television series